Goodbye to the Edge City is the debut EP from Preston School of Industry, released in 2001.

Critical reception
Trouser Press wrote that "the five songs are half-baked, with few stylistic surprises aside from the horn section and children’s backing vocals that grace the goofy 'Something Always Happens.'"

Track listing 

"Somethings Happen Always"	
"How to Impress the Goddess pt2"	
"The Spaces In Between"
"Where You Gonna Go?"
"Goodbye to the Edge City"

References 

2001 albums
Preston School of Industry (band) albums